John Conte (September 15, 1915 – September 4, 2006) was a stage, film and TV actor, and television station owner.

Early years
Conte was born in Palmer, Massachusetts. His mother was Italian and his father was French-Italian. The family moved to Los Angeles, California when John was 5.

While a student at Lincoln High School in Los Angeles, Conte focused on classes in drama and for three years was the school's top entrant in Shakespearian competition. After graduating, he joined the Pasadena Playhouse and "took every role offered to him juvenile, leading man, character."  He later got jobs as a radio actor and singer.

Radio
Conte entered broadcasting with a job at KFAC in Los Angeles. Two years later, he had become a network announcer. One of his first regular roles was on The Grape Nuts Program (1937-1938) with George Burns and Gracie Allen. Conte was host for Screen Test and master of ceremonies for the Maxwell House program that featured Fanny Brice and Frank Morgan. He was the announcer for Silver Theater, It Happened in Hollywood, and The Screen Guild Show.

Stage
In 1947, he appeared in Rodgers and Hammerstein's short-lived Broadway musical Allegro,although his singing voice doesn't appear on the original Broadway cast recording, his understudy, Robert Reeves made the recording. He returned to Broadway in 1950 to appear in the musical Arms and the Girl (1950) and Carousel (1954).

Film 
His major film role was Drunky in The Man with the Golden Arm (1955). He also was seen in The Carpetbaggers and Lost in a Harem.

Television
Conte was host of his own variety program, titled John Conte's Little Show (also known as Van Camp's Little Show), on NBC from 1950 to 1951 and on ABC in 1953. He was master of ceremonies on the 1951 late Sunday afternoon comedy hour Star Time,  co-starring Frances Langford and Lew Parker as John and Blanche Bickerson as well as sound-effects master stand-up comedian Reginald Gardner. His own weekly solo skit on Star Time was as a heavily accented Italian-American chef preparing bumbled recipes as he recited them along with frequent tangential references to "the homemade-a wine" fermenting in his bathtub visible from the kitchen.

Conte was host of The Feminine Touch (1951) on ABC. He had a featured guest appearance with Sid Caesar on Your Show of Shows about a year later.
In 1953, Conte was host of Personality Puzzle, a game show on ABC.

Conte made five guest appearances on Perry Mason: In three different episodes, he played the role of the murder victim. In another episode, he was the defendant, and, in still another, the murderer.

From October 31, 1955 to July 27, 1959, Conte was the host of Matinee Theater, a one-hour color anthology program on the fledgling NBC Television Network. The program aired at 12 noon New York Time live to the entire network from its new color studios in Burbank, California. Color television was new at that time and the network needed a program that would allow technicians to see if their new home television set installations were working properly. With his great physical appearance and wonderful professional demeanor, Conte was the perfect host for the program.

In 1968, he and his long-term third wife, Sirpuhe Philibosian Conte, launched KMIR-TV, an NBC-affiliated UHF station in the Palm Springs–Rancho Mirage market. The Contes built KMIR into the third-largest station in the Coachella Valley, and after 30 years (in 1999), sold the station to Milwaukee-based Journal Communications.

Other activities 
He was a founding sponsor of the Eisenhower Medical Center in Rancho Mirage and one of the founders of the McCallum Theatre in Palm Desert, California.

Recognition 
On February 8, 1960, Conte was awarded a star on the Hollywood Walk of Fame at 6119 Hollywood Blvd. In 1997, a Golden Palm Star on the Walk of Stars was dedicated to him.

Death
On September 4, 2006, Conte died at Eisenhower Medical Center in Rancho Mirage, California, at age 90. He was survived by his wife, a son, two stepdaughters, six grandchildren, and five great-grandchildren.

Filmography

Radio appearances

References

 Rourke, Mary. (2006, September 7). "John Conte, 90; Stage, Screen, Radio Actor Founded the NBC Affiliate in Palm Desert". The Los Angeles Times
 Associated Press. (2006, September 8). "John Conte, 90, Actor on Stage and TV". The New York Times, page A25

External links
 
 
 
 

1915 births
2006 deaths
American male film actors
American male musical theatre actors
American male radio actors
American male television actors
American television executives
Burials at Forest Lawn Cemetery (Cathedral City)
Male actors from Los Angeles
Male actors from Palm Springs, California
People from Palmer, Massachusetts
20th-century American male actors
20th-century American male singers
20th-century American singers